Emma Holly (born 1961, New Jersey) is American author who specializes in writing erotic romance novels, often with a focus on BDSM. She has written over twenty books and was a finalist for the Romance Writers of America 2004 RITA award for Best Paranormal Romance.

Biography
Emma Holly was born in New Jersey and raised in Baltimore, where she lived with her older sister Laurie.

Leading back to her pre-adolescent fantasy, to be the fiancée of Batman, Holly always wanted to be a writer. After 10 years of writing, she sold her first book in 1998.

Holly specializes in writing erotica-romance and often with a focus on BDSM. Another common element of Holly's erotic style is a bisexual male protagonist. She has written over twenty books and was a finalist for the Romance Writers of America 2004 RITA award for Best Paranormal Romance.

Bibliography

Single erotica-romance novels
 Ménage, 1998
 Cooking Up a Storm, 1998
 Velvet Glove, 1999
 In the Flesh, 2000
 Strange Attractions, 2004
 Personal Assets, 2004
 All U Can Eat, 2006
 Fairyville, 2007, 2008 (with epilogue, previously published as Amazon short, And Then There Were Four).

Beyond Desire series

Beyond Innocence, 2001 also in Beyond Desire
Beyond Seduction, 2002 also in Beyond Desire

Midnight Desire series

Demons series

The Demon's Daughter, 2004
The Demon's Angel in Demon's Delight
The Countess' Pleasure in Hot Spell
Prince of ice, 2006
Demon's Fire, 2008

Anthologies and collections

References

External links
Emma Holly's Website
Emma Holly in FantasticFiction

1961 births
Living people
20th-century American novelists
21st-century American novelists
American women novelists
BDSM writers
American erotica writers
20th-century American women writers
21st-century American women writers
Women erotica writers